The Fox is the fifteenth studio album by English musician Elton John, released in 1981. The album was produced by John, Clive Franks, and, for the first time, Chris Thomas, who would produce many more albums with John through most of the 1980s and 1990s.

Five of the eleven songs on the album (noted below) were recorded during the sessions for his previous album 21 at 33. The album was met with limited success upon its release, but has received some critical reappraisal in recent years.

Release
The album reached the top ten and top 40 charts in many countries, receiving a silver certification in the United Kingdom. The first single, "Nobody Wins", charted in the US at #21, but charted best in Norway, peaking at #10. The next single, "Chloe", charted on the Adult Contemporary chart at #16. "Just Like Belgium" failed to chart despite being released as a single in some countries where John's music had been successful.

Record World said of "Chloe" that "Music-box keyboards and synthesizer jet streams guide Elton's reassuring vocal through this grandiose ballad."

After 1981, only "Chloe", "Just Like Belgium", "Nobody Wins" and "Elton's Song" would be included in John's 1982 Jump Up! Tour. While "Chloe", "Just Like Belgium" and "Nobody Wins" have not been performed since that tour, "Elton's Song" was performed a few times on a solo tour in 1999. John has not performed it since.

However, since the album's release, Elton would perform "Carla/Etude" on his 1986 world tour with the Melbourne Symphony Orchestra and on subsequent solo tours, plus on a set of 2004 shows with the Royal Academy of Music Orchestra, making it the only song on the album that was performed up to 2010 on a tour with Ray Cooper.

Track listing

Notes
 Heart in the Right Place, Carla/Etude, Fanfare, Chloe, and Elton's Song were recorded in August 1979 to March 1980 and produced by John and Clive Franks. Chris Thomas produced the other tracks. 
 In 2003, Mercury/Universal and The Rocket Record Company reissued the album on CD, remastered by Gary Moore. The line-up contained no bonus tracks. On the 2003 reissue and remaster (and European CD), Carla/Etude, Fanfare, and Chloe are combined into one track, making it a nine-track album. 
 French and Quebec releases of the album included "J'Veux de la Tendresse" in place of "Nobody Wins". "Tendresse" was the original French version of the song which Osborne wrote English lyrics for, thus transforming the song into "Nobody Wins".
On the 1990 box set, To Be Continued..., "Fanfare" and "Chloe" are combined into one track.

Visions: The videos from The Fox
Visions, released on VHS in 1982, is a video of all ten songs recorded for The Fox album. It is notable as one of the first long-form video releases of an album. The collection was also released on RCA's CED video disc and Laserdisc, a precursor to the DVD, but has not been released since. The video for "Elton's Song", which dealt with the story of a teenage boy's admiration for another teenage boy he yearns for, but who is too shy to confront his feelings, was excluded from the UK video release because the public school it was filmed in objected to the theme of the song. All the videos were conceptualised by Keith Williams and directed by Russell Mulcahy.

Personnel 
Track numbering refers to CD and digital releases of the album.

 Elton John – lead vocals, vocal solo (1), backing vocals (1, 2, 4, 5, 9), pianos (1, 3, 5), acoustic piano (2, 6–11)
 James Newton Howard – synthesizers (1-4, 7, 9, 10), vocoder (2), synthesizer programming (4, 10), string arrangements and conductor (6, 7, 8), Fender Rhodes (8), Hammond organ (11)
 Steve Porcaro – synthesizers (5)
 Richie Zito – guitars (1, 3, 5, 9, 11)
 Steve Lukather – guitar solo (9)
 Dee Murray – bass (1, 3, 5, 9, 11), backing vocals (8)
 Reggie McBride – bass (2, 8)
 Nigel Olsson – drums (1, 3, 5, 9, 11)
 Alvin Taylor – drums (2, 8)
 Roger Linn – drum synthesizer programming (4)
 Jeff Porcaro – drum programming (5)
 Stephanie Spruill – tambourine (1, 9), backing vocals (9)
 Victor Feldman – percussion (7, 8)
 Jim Horn – alto saxophone (3)
 Mickey Raphael – harmonica (11)
 Marty Paich – string arrangements (8)
 London Symphony Orchestra – strings (6, 7, 8)
 Bill Champlin – backing vocals (1, 8, 9)
 Venette Gloud – backing vocals (1, 9)
 Tamara Matoesian, now Tamara Champlin – backing vocals (1, 9)
 Colette Bertrand – French girl (3)
 James Cleveland – spoken voice and choir director (5)
 Cornerstone Baptist Church Choir – choir (5)
 Max Carl – backing vocals (8)
 Gary Osborne – backing vocals (8)
 Ronald Baker – backing vocals (11)
 Carl Carwell – backing vocals (11)
 Chuck Cissel – backing vocals (11)
 Clarence Ford – backing vocals (11)
 Roy Galloway – backing vocals (11)
 Jim Gilstrap – backing vocals (11)
 John Lehman – backing vocals (11)
 Oren Waters – backing vocals (11)

Production 
 Producers – Chris Thomas (Tracks #1, 3–5, 9, 11); Clive Franks and Elton John (Tracks #2, 6–8, 10).
 Recorded by Bill Price
 Assistant Engineers – Jeremy Green, Patrick Janeaud, John Kurlander, Steve McManus, Peggy McCreary and Karen Siegel.
 Mastered by Tim Young
 Art Direction – Richard Seireeni
 Photography – Eric Blum
 Elton John Photo – Terry O'Neill
 Furniture provided by Fat Chance 
 Mixed at Sunset Sound (Hollywood, California) and Wessex Sound Studios (London, UK).

Charts

Weekly charts

Year-end charts

Certifications

}

References

External links

Elton John albums
1981 albums
Albums produced by Elton John
Albums produced by Chris Thomas (record producer)
Geffen Records albums
The Rocket Record Company albums
Albums recorded at Sunset Sound Recorders